HSC Santorini Palace (ex Highspeed 7, Highspeed 5) is an 85m high speed catamaran operated by Minoan Lines.

History
The vessel was built as Highspeed 5 by Austal at Henderson, Australia in 2005, on order by Greek ferry operator Hellenic Seaways.
She entered service with Hellenic Seaways in July 2005, initially sailing between Piraeus and Cyclades and in later years between Heraklion and central Cyclades. In 2016, after being repaired due to fire, she was renamed Highspeed 7.

In early summer 2018, Highspeed 7 was transferred to Minoan Lines as part of the deal for the sale of Minoan's stake in Hellenic Seaways to Attica Group. She was renamed Santorini Palace and painted in Minoan's colors on June 13, 2018.

Fire incident and change of name to HS7
On March 23, 2015, while Highspeed 5 was docked at Drapetsona for modification works and inspections, a fire broke out on board that resulted in the death of the chief electrician and the destruction of her bridge and upper decks. In September 2015, the vessel was towed to Fincantieri shipyards in Trieste, where she underwent extensive repairs. During them, the upper car deck was substituted with a passenger lounge, increasing her capacity to 1160 passengers. After being repaired, she was renamed Highspeed 7 and resumed her Heraklion - Cyclades service in mid June 2016.

References

External links
Austal Ships - Auto Express 85 - Highspeed 5 specifications
Santorini Palace at Minoan Lines Website

Gallery

Ships built by Austal
Ferries of Greece
Individual catamarans
2005 ships